The Bell Tower is a chamber opera in one act by Ernst Krenek, his Op. 153. The English libretto by the composer was inspired by the short story by Herman Melville (collected in The Piazza Tales), the events only mysteriously hinted at in the story becoming a point of departure for the explicit dramatic action of Krenek's piece. It was commissioned by the Fromm Foundation and written in 1955–56, receiving its premiere on 17 March 1957 at the University of Illinois (recorded on CRS 5).

Roles

Orchestra: 1.1.1.0-0.1.1.0-perc-pft-str (offstage: 2tpt, trmb, sn-dr.)

References
Notes

Sources
 Stewart, John L., Ernst Krenek: The Man and His Music.   University of California Press, 1991

External links
Melville's story at the Gutenburg Project
Recording of premiere

Operas
One-act operas
Chamber operas
English-language operas
Operas by Ernst Krenek
1957 operas